Nakhon Ratchasima QminC Women's Volleyball Club is a Thai professional volleyball club based in Nakhon Ratchasima, Thailand.

The club has played at the top level of Thai volleyball for the majority of their existence and is competing in the Thailand League. The club was founded in 2005. Their current home stadium is The Mall Nakhon Ratchasima which has a capacity of 2,500.

Honors

Domestic competitions

Thailand League 
 Champion (5): 2006, 2007, 2013–14, 2018–19, 2022–23
 Runner-up (2): 2017–18, 2020–21
 Third (7): 2007–08, 2009–10, 2010–11, 2012–13, 2015–16, 2016–17, 2019–20
Thai-Denmark Super League 
 Runner-up (2): 2014, 2019
 Third (3): 2016, 2017, 2018

International competitions

Major
Asian Club Championship 1 appearances 
 2014 —  5th place
 2021 —   Runner-up
 2023 —  TBA

Minor
 VTV Binh Dien Cup 
2021 — Cancel

Former names 

Nakhon Ratchasima (2005–2016)
Nakhon Ratchasima The Mall (2016–2021)
Nakhon Ratchasima QminC (2021–present)

Crest 
he club logo incorporates elements from their nickname; The Cat Devill and their owner The Mall Nakhon Ratchasima

Team colors 
Thailand League

    (2005–2017)
    (2018)
     (2019)
     (2020–present)

Thai-Denmark Super League

    (2005–2019)
     (2019)

Stadium and locations

League results

Team roster 2022–23

Team staff 
As of January 2023

Sponsors 

 The Mall Korat
 Kubota
 Fast Fac
 Wana Nawa Hua Hin
 Fbt
 CP
 Seven Eleven
 Nakhon Ratchasima Province
 Government Lottery
 QMin-C
 Chok Yuen Yong

Position Main 

 The following is the Khonkaen Star roster in the : 2022–23 Women's Volleyball Thailand League

{| class="toccolours" align="center" width="410px"
! style="background:#FF7918" |Nakhon Ratchasrima The Mall VC
|-
|<div style="position: relative;">

{{Image label||x=0.30|y=0.15|scale=350|text=5.Lauren Matthews}}

</div>
|}

 2021–22 Results and fixtures 

 Thailand League 

 First leg 

 second leg 

 final 

 Imports 

 Head coach 

 Team Captains 

 Konwika Apinyapong (2005–2013)
 Wilawan Apinyapong (2013–2015)
 Hattaya Bamrungsuk (2015–2017)
 Onuma Sittirak (2017–2019)
 Yaowalak Mahaon (2019)
 Nootsara Tomkom (2019–2020)
 Chatchu-on Moksri (2020–2021)
 Sirima Manakit (2021–present)

 Notable players Domestic Players Konwika Apinyapong
 Rasamee Supamool
 Wanida Kotruang
 Jarunee Sannok
 Wirawan Sattayanuchit
 Wilawan Apinyapong
 Phanida Artwet
 Pornnapat Kongklang
 Sornsawan Kasanthing
 Hattaya Bamrungsuk
 Chatchu-on Moksri
 Chutima Srisaikaew
 Ploypailin Kanklang
 Piyatida Theeratjirod
 Lamyai Jansod
 Chanida Meechai
 Wiranyupa Inchan
 Onuma Sittirak
 Jarasporn Bundasak
 Malika Kanthong
 Jureerat Saeaung
 Amporn Hyapha 
 Nootsara Tomkom 
 Chatchu-on Moksri (loan to Sarıyer Belediyespor) Foreign players'''

 Mai Okumura (2018–2019)

 Yeliz Başa (2019), (2020–2021)

 Strashimira Filipova (2019)

 Rebecca Perry (2019)

 Daimí Ramírez (2019) 

 Mylene Paat (2020–2021)
 Aleona Denise Manabat (2020–2021)

 Alli Cudworth (2022–2023)
 Lawren Methhews (2022–2023)

References

Volleyball clubs in Thailand